Kazys Musteikis (November 22, 1894 – June 6, 1977) was a Lithuanian military brigadier general, Lithuanian Minister of National Defence in 1938–1940.

Biography 
On September 1939 in the beginning of the Invasion of Poland and the World War II he supported Lithuania's neutrality and was against Adolf Hitler's call to Lithuanians to attack Vilnius. After receiving the 1940 Soviet ultimatum to Lithuania on the night of 14–15 June 1940 during the last meeting of the Lithuanian government held in Kaunas he urged to decline the ultimatum and argued for military resistance. On 15 June 1940 he called on the 9th Infantry Regiment of Marijampolė to cover the departure of the President Antanas Smetona and to symbolically resist the Army of the Soviet Union, the regiment marched but was stopped in Vilkaviškis. The same day he left for Germany. He died in Chicago in 1977.

Musteikis was a recipient of the Order of the Lithuanian Grand Duke Gediminas 3rd Class (1929), the Order of Vytautas the Great 3rd Class (1935) and other medals.

References 

1894 births
1977 deaths
People from Utena District Municipality
Lithuanian generals
Lithuanian anti-communists
Recipients of the Order of the Lithuanian Grand Duke Gediminas
Recipients of the Order of Vytautas the Great
Lithuanian emigrants to the United States